Gejlarat-e Sharqi Rural District is in Aras District of Poldasht County, West Azerbaijan province, Iran. At the National Census of 2006, its population (as a part of the former Poldasht District of Maku County) was 6,578 in 1,445 households. There were 7,268 inhabitants in 1,857 households at the following census of 2011, by which time the district had been separated from the county, Poldasht County established, and divided into two districts: the Central and Aras Districts. At the most recent census of 2016, the population of the rural district was 6,854 in 1,911 households. The largest of its 27 villages was Shahrak-e Aras, with 1,888 people.

References 

Poldasht County

Rural Districts of West Azerbaijan Province

Populated places in West Azerbaijan Province

Populated places in Poldasht County